Foum Zguid is a town in Tata Province, Souss-Massa, southeastern Morocco. According to the 2004 census it had a population of 9,630, the second-highest in the province after the capital Tata.

Foum Zguid is on the N12 highway to the northeast of Tata. Iriqui National Park is to the south of Foum Zguid, as is the border with Algeria, but no roads lead to either.

References

External links

Populated places in Tata Province